Gastropholis tropidopholis is a species of lizard endemic to the Democratic Republic of the Congo.

References

Gastropholis
Reptiles described in 1916
Taxa named by George Albert Boulenger
Endemic fauna of the Democratic Republic of the Congo